2015 ACC tournament may refer to:

 2015 ACC men's basketball tournament
 2015 ACC women's basketball tournament
 2015 ACC men's soccer tournament
 2015 ACC women's soccer tournament
 2015 Atlantic Coast Conference baseball tournament
 2015 Atlantic Coast Conference softball tournament